The Gutiérrez River is a small river in the northwestern Argentine Patagonia (the region of Comahue).

This short river divides the city of Bariloche in two.

The river is also used for fly fishing, and cross a military camp in the middle of their path.

References
 Maps — Map with rivers and routes from Rio Negro Province
 Ministry of Environment — Hydrological basins of Argentina.

Rivers of Río Negro Province
Rivers of Argentina